Maple (Persian: افرا‎, romanized: Afra) is an Iranian romance-drama television series directed by Behrang Tofighi, which aired on IRIB TV1 from 27 August to 10 October, 2021 for 38 episodes.

Plot 
Mahmoud (Mehdi Soltani) owns a tea and rice factory and is famous for the reputation of the factory. He has a son named Massoud (Roozbeh Hesari) and a daughter named Maedeh (Sara Bagheri). with Mahmoud's insistence, Massoud marries his cousin Mahtab (Mina Vahid), who is a surgeon, but because Massoud works as a Park Ranger and their marriage is forced, they do not understand each other and decide to divorce after 5 years of marriage.

On the other hand, Peyman (Mohammad Sadeghi), Vahid's brother (Mahmoud's worker) has fallen in love with Maedeh, but Mahmoud is against it and rejects Peyman's proposal to Maedah. later Mahmoud agrees to the proposal but..

Cast 
 Mehdi Soltani as Mahmoud Forouzesh
 Pejman Bazeghi as Vahid Gholi Pour
 Roozbeh Hesari as Masoud Forouzesh
 Mina Vahid as Mahtab Forouzesh
 Sara Bagheri as Maedeh Forouzesh
 Mohammad Sadeghi as Peyman Gholi Pour
 Hamoun Seyedi as Aghil Gholi Pour
 Fariba Motakhases as Azam
 Nasrin Babaei as Parvin
 Fahimeh Momeni as Saba
 Esmail Mehrabi as Sirous Gholi Pour
 Alireza Ara as Hamed Majd
 Payam Dehkordi as Afrasiab Mamani
 Mehdi Mehraban as Koroush
 Mehrdad Bakhshi as Alireza
 Arya Dlfani as Mehran
 Bahman Sadegh Hassani as Rahimi
 Daryoush Salimi as Rasouli

Reception

Rating 
According to Islamic republic of Iran broadcasting , a poll conducted on September 25, 2021 from all over the country that shows 78.9% of the people have watched the programs of television, among them, the TV series Maple recorded 43.8% of the rating.

Awards and nominations

References

External links 
 

Iranian television series
Islamic Republic of Iran Broadcasting original programming
2021 Iranian television series debuts
2021 Iranian television series endings